Lymantria dispar, also known as the gypsy moth or the spongy moth, is a species of moth in the family Erebidae. Lymantria dispar is subdivided into several subspecies, with subspecies such as L. d. dispar and L. d. japonica being clearly identifiable without ambiguity. Lymantria dispar has been introduced to several continents and is now found in Europe, Africa, Asia, North America and South America. The polyphagous larvae live on a variety of deciduous and coniferous trees and can cause severe damage in years of mass reproduction. Due to these features, Lymantria dispar is listed among the world's 100 worst invasive alien species.

Etymology

The name “gypsy moth” does not have conclusive origins, however it has been in use since 1908. 

Moths of the subfamily Lymantriinae are commonly called tussock moths due to the tussock-like tufts of hair on the caterpillars. 

The name Lymantria dispar is composed of two Latin-derived words. The generic name Lymantria means 'destroyer'. The species epithet dispar means 'to separate' in Latin; it refers to the sexual dimorphism observed in the male and female imagines.

In July 2021 the Entomological Society of America decided to remove the name "gypsy moth" from its Common Names of Insects and Related Organisms List as "hurtful to the Romani people". In January 2022, the new common name "spongy moth" was proposed, as a translation from the French name "spongieuse" for the species, referring to the sponge-like egg masses laid by L. dispar.

Taxonomy
The North American and European Lymantria dispar moths are considered to be the same subspecies, usually referred to as Lymantria dispar dispar. Confusion over the classification of species and subspecies exists. The U. S. Department of Agriculture defines the Asian subspecies as "any biotype of L. dispar possessing female flight capability", despite L. d. asiatica not being the only accepted subspecies that is capable of flight. Traditionally, L. dispar has been referred to as "gypsy moth" even when referring to Japanese, Indian and Asiatic populations.

Subspecies 

The European subspecies (Lymantria dispar dispar) is native to temperate forests in western Europe. It had been introduced to the United States in 1869, and to Canada in 1912.

The Asian subspecies (Lymantria dispar asiatica) is native to temperate Asia east of the Ural mountains. Since the early 1990s it has also been detected along the West Coast of temperate North America. From Southern Europe it is spreading northwards into Germany and other countries, where it hybridizes with the European spongy moth, L. d. dispar. A colony had been reported from Great Britain in 1995.

Biological pest control measures
In North America, several species of parasitoids and predators have been introduced as biological control agents in attempts to help control this moth. Beginning in the late 1800's, at least 10 species have become established in this way, but for nearly a century there was little regulation or research on the effectiveness or non-target effects of these introduced natural enemies. Several were generalists that offered little control of L. dispar and attacked other native insects. One such species is the tachinid fly Compsilura concinnata, which attacked many other host species (over 180 known hosts documented), decimating many of the large moth species previously abundant in the Northeast. Another is the encyrtid wasp Ooencyrtus kuvanae which attacks L. dispar eggs but is not strictly host specific, and also parasitizes the eggs of other Lepidoptera species. The most effective control agents are microbial pathogens; a virus (LdmNPV), and a fungus (Entomophaga maimaiga).

Notes

References

External links

Gypsy moth on UKmoths
Bugguide.net
Species Profile: European Gypsy Moth (Lymantria dispar) from the National Invasive Species Information Center, United States National Agricultural Library

 
Lymantria
Moths described in 1758
Moths of Japan
Moths of Europe
Moths of North America
Moths of Asia
Naming controversies
Taxa named by Carl Linnaeus